Cardfight!! Vanguard G: Z is the fifth and final season of Cardfight!! Vanguard G and the ninth season overall in the Cardfight!! Vanguard series and the final chapter of The TRY 3 Saga. It began airing in Japan on October 8, 2017.

Plot
A group of six units from Planet Cray, called the "Apostles", have invaded Earth. Armed with the power of the six Zeroth Dragons, the Apostles aim to revive the sealed Dragon Deity of Destruction, Gyze who attempted to destroy Cray in the past. The final battle between the Vanguards and the Dragon Deity of Destruction begins. In order for Gyze to move freely on earth, The Apostles target Chrono, because of him being the singularity point for Gear Chronicle. Team Try 3 must reunite and master the power of Dimensional Overstride, or lose those they care about to the Dragon Deity of Destruction.

Theme songs

Japanese

Opening theme
“Flowers of Emotion" by Kiryu (eps. 1–24)
Ending theme
 "-HEROIC ADVENT-" by Roselia (eps. 1–24)

English

Opening theme
“Hello, Mr. Wonder land" by Ayako Nakanomori (eps. 1–24)
Ending theme
 "Wing of Image" by RUMMY LABYRINTH (eps. 1–24)

Main Characters 

 Chrono Shindou
 Shion Kiba
 Tokoha Anjou
 Kazuma Shouji
 Taiyou Asukawa
 Aichi Sendou
 Kouji Ibuki

Antagonists 

 Kazuma Shouji/Gyze
 Arte Hibino/Gastille
 Ruga Kaizu/Valeos
 Gaily Kurt/Gredora
 Sousuke Wakamizu/Darkface
 Saori Fuchidaka/Dumjid
 Noa Hoshizaki/Chaos Breaker

Episode list

References

Cardfight!! Vanguard
2017 Japanese television seasons
2018 Japanese television seasons